This is a list of international visits undertaken by Hillary Clinton (in office 2009–2013) while serving as the United States Secretary of State. The list includes both private travel and official state visits. The list includes only foreign travel which the Secretary of State made during her tenure in the position.

Summary 
The number of visits per country where Secretary Clinton traveled are:
 One visit to Albania, Angola, Argentina, Bahrain, Bangladesh, Barbados, Benin, Brunei, Bulgaria, Chile, Congo, Cook Islands, Costa Rica, Côte d'Ivoire, Croatia, Dominican Republic, Ecuador, El Salvador, Estonia, Ethiopia, Finland, Ghana, Greece, Greenland, Honduras, Hungary, Iraq, Italy, Jamaica, Jordan, Kazakhstan, Kuwait, Kyrgyzstan, Laos, Latvia, Lebanon, Libya, Malawi, Malaysia, Malta, Mongolia, New Zealand, Norway, Papua New Guinea, Poland, Portugal, Senegal, South Sudan, Spain, Sweden, Tajikistan, Tanzania, Timor Leste, Togo, Trinidad and Tobago, Uganda, Ukraine, Uruguay, Yemen and Zambia
 Two visits to Algeria, Armenia, Australia, Azerbaijan, Bosnia and Herzegovina, Colombia, Denmark, Georgia, Guatemala, India, Ireland, Kenya, Kosovo, Liberia, Lithuania, Morocco, Myanmar, Netherlands, Nigeria, Oman, Peru, Philippines, Qatar, Saudi Arabia, Serbia, South Africa, Tunisia and Uzbekistan
 Three visits to Cambodia, Cape Verde, the Palestinian National Authority, Singapore, Thailand, United Arab Emirates and Vietnam
 Four visits to Afghanistan, Brazil, Canada, Czech Republic, Haiti, Indonesia, Japan, Pakistan and Russia
 Five visits to Israel, Mexico, South Korea, Switzerland and Turkey 
 Six visits to Belgium, Egypt and Germany
 Seven visits to China 
 Eight visits to France and the United Kingdom

Table

References

2009 beginnings
2012 endings
2000s in international relations
2000s politics-related lists
2010s in international relations
2010s politics-related lists
United States Secretary of State
S
Hillary Clinton
United States diplomacy-related lists
|Clinton
2010s timelines